Margot is a feminine French given name, a variant of Marguerite. It is also occasionally a surname. Persons named Margot include the following:

People with the given name Margot 
 Margot Asquith, countess of Oxford and Asquith
 Marguerite de Valois, known as La Reine Margot, queen of France and of Navarre
 Margot Arce de Vázquez, Puerto Rican essayist and educator
 Margot Bennett (1912–1980), Scottish screenwriter and crime author 
 Margot Boer (born 1985), Dutch speed skater
 Margot Bryant, British actress
 Margot Eskens (born 1939), German singer 
 Margot Fonteyn, British ballerina
 Margot Franssen (born 1952), Dutch-born Canadian entrepreneur and activist
 Margot Frank (1926–1945), sister of German World War II diarist Anne Frank
 Margot van Geffen (born 1989), Dutch field hockey player
 Margot Heuman (born 1928), German-born American Holocaust survivor
 Margot Hielscher (1919–2017), German singer and actress 
 Margot Honecker (1927–2016), German politician, former wife of Erich Honecker
 Margot Käßmann (born 1958), German theologist and writer 
 Margot Kidder, Canadian-American actress known for playing Lois Lane in Superman
 Margot Lander, Danish ballerina
 Margot Lumb, British squash player
 Margot Marsman (born 1932), Dutch swimmer
 Margot Osmeña (born 1949), Filipino politician
 Margot Pardoe (1902–1996), British children's writer
 Margot Rojas Mendoza (1903–1996), Cuban pianist and teacher
 Margot Robbie (born 1990), Australian actress 
 Margot Roosevelt, American journalist
 Małgorzata Szutowicz (born 1995), widely known as Margot, Polish non-binary LGBTQIA activist and co-founder of the Stop Bzdurom collective
 Margot Taulé, Dominican engineer and architect
 Margot Wallström (born 1954), Swedish politician and government minister
 Margot Wells, Scottish sprinter
 Margot Zemach, American illustrator

People with the surname Margot 
 Georges Margot (born 1902), French equestrian
 Jean-Luc Margot (born 1969), Belgian astronomer
 Manuel Margot (born 1994), Dominican baseball player

In entertainment and culture 
Margot, 2009 film starring Anne-Marie Duff as ballerina Margot Fonteyn
Margot at the Wedding, 2007 American film by Noah Baumbach
 La Reine Margot, 1845 novel by Alexandre Dumas
 La Reine Margot (1994 film), 1994 film based on the Dumas novel starring Isabelle Adjani
 Margot, a character in the movie Legally Blonde
 Margot Tenenbaum, a character in the film The Royal Tenenbaums 
Margot, the protagonist of Ray Bradbury's All Summer in a Day
 Margot Mary Wendice, a character in the 1954 Alfred Hitchcock film Dial M For Murder
 Margot Beste-Chetwynde, a character in Evelyn Waugh's novel Decline and Fall 
 Margot Lane, assistant to Lamont Cranston, a character in the 1940 American film serial The Shadow

French feminine given names
Feminine given names
Surnames